The R561 is a Regional Route in South Africa.

Route
Its northern origin is Zanzibar border post with Botswana in Limpopo province. It heads south, crossing the R572 at the village of Maasstroom. It crosses the N11 at a staggered crossing at the village of Baltimore and ends at an intersection with the R518 at Marken.

References

Regional Routes in Limpopo